Galium propinquum is a species of plant in the family Rubiaceae.

References

propinquum
Flora of Australia
Flora of New Zealand